Koç is a Turkish word that may refer to:

Surname
 Ahmet Koç, bağlama  artist from Turkey
 Ali Yıldırım Koç (born 1967), Turkish businessman
 Anıl Koç (born 1995), Turkish-Belgian footballer
 Atilla Koç (born, 1946), Turkish politician
 Cengiz Koç (born 1977), German heavyweight boxer of Turkish descent
 Filiz Koç (born in 1986), Turkish-German women's footballer, model and sports reporter
 Hakan Koç (born 1980), Turkish freestyle wrestler 
 Haluk Koç (born 1954), Turkish politician
 Hüseyin Koç (born 1979), Turkish volleyball player
 İnanç Koç (born 1979), Turkish professional basketball player
 Meryem Koç (born 1996), Turkish women's footballer
 Okan Koç (born 1982), Turkish professional footballer
 Rahmi Koç (born 1930), Turkish businessman
 Serhat Koç (born 1990), Dutch footballer of Turkish descent
 Süleyman Koç (born 1989), Turkish-German footballer
 Vehbi Koç (1901-1996), Turkish businessman

Other uses
 Koç family, Turkish dynasty of business people
 Koç Holding, industrial conglomerate in Turkey founded and controlled by the Koç family
 Koç School, private school in Istanbul, Turkey
 Koç University, private university in Istanbul

See also
Koch (surname)

Turkish-language surnames